The Battle of Sangarará was fought on November 18, 1780 in Sangarará, Viceroyalty of Peru, between rebel forces under Túpac Amaru II and Spanish colonial forces under Tiburcio Landa.  Túpac Amaru II's forces won decisively.

Background
The Battle of Sangarará took place nine days after the execution of Antonio de Arriaga, the corregidor of Tinta.  Sangarará was the first major conflict between Spanish and rebel forces in the Rebellion of Túpac Amaru.  Following the capture of Quiquijana, which had been abandoned by its corregidor, on November 12, 1780, meetings were held in Cuzco to establish a war council.    Forces consisting of 800 from surrounding areas were combined with volunteers and militia from Cuzco and were organized under Tiburcio Landa. They arrived in Sangarará on the night of November 17 and based themselves in the town's church.  The expectation of the arrival of a snowstorm may have influenced the Spanish decision to fortify the church in addition to strategic reasons.

The battle
In the morning hours of November 18, the rebel forces occupied nearby hills and surrounded the church.  Sympathetic historical accounts outline Túpac Amaru II's request that Creoles, women, and children be allowed to leave the church before the attack.  The rebels began attacking the Spanish with slingshots until the church caught fire, either through arson by Túpac Amaru II or through the sudden spark of Spanish gunpowder.  The Spanish fled the church and were routed by the surrounding forces, who were armed with only spears and slings.  Spanish troops had brought cannons with them, but they were rendered ineffective by the walls of the church.  Historical casualty estimates for the Spanish ranged from 300 to 576.  Estimates for rebel casualties number only 15 killed and 30 wounded.

Aftermath
Túpac Amaru II's decisive victory helped to boost his support among Indians and gained him Spanish arms.  It also helped to create fear among the Spanish in the area, although Spanish colonial officials used the violent nature of the battle in propaganda against the rebels.  The Bishop of Cuzco excommunicated Túpac Amaru II from the church for the destruction of the church in Sangarará.  The violent, anti-religious portrayals of the rebel leadership helped to limit support from Creoles and Mestizos.  Following the battle, the rebels solidified their hold on the outside areas instead  of attacking Cuzco, going against the advice of fellow commander (and Túpac Amaru II's wife) Micaela Bastidas.

References

Sangarara
Colonial Peru
Conflicts in 1780